George Granville William Sutherland-Leveson-Gower, 3rd Duke of Sutherland KG FRS (19 December 1828 – 22 September 1892), styled Viscount Trentham until 1833, Earl Gower in 1833 and Marquess of Stafford between 1833 and 1861, was a British politician from the Leveson-Gower family.

Early life
Sutherland was born on 19 December 1828 at Hamilton Place, London. He was the son of George Sutherland-Leveson-Gower, 2nd Duke of Sutherland and Lady Harriet Elizabeth Georgiana Howard.

He was educated at Eton College and King's College London.

Career
Sutherland was Liberal Member of Parliament for Sutherland from 1852 until he succeeded his father as Duke in 1861.

He took part in a number of state occasions. He was one of the British delegation to the coronation of Tsar Alexander II of Russia in 1856, hosted the public visit by Garibaldi to Britain in 1864, attended the opening of the Suez Canal in 1869, and accompanied the Prince of Wales (later Edward VII) on his state visit to India in 1876.

He was Lord Lieutenant for the county of Cromarty from 1852 until the role was abolished in 1891, and Lord Lieutenant of Sutherland from 1861 until his death.

Sutherland chaired a committee that organised charitable work to help those involved with the Turko-Russian and Zulu wars.

Military positions and honours
Sutherland was Colonel of the Sutherland Regiment of Highland Volunteers from 1864 to 1882, and of the 20th Middlesex Rifle Volunteer Corps (Railway Rifles) in 1867. He was awarded Honorary Membership of the Institution of Engineers and Shipbuilders in Scotland in 1859. He was made KG in 1864, and FRS in 1870. He was a Knight Grand Cross of the Order of the Redeemer of Greece.

Railway interests
The Third Duke played a key role in the early history of the Highland Railway, being a founder board member of the company and contributing extensively towards the Sutherland Railway, building the Duke of Sutherland's Railway out of his own pocket and also supporting the Sutherland and Caithness Railway. The Highland Railway operated these lines, absorbing them in 1884.

He was President of the Mont Cenis Railway Company which built the first Fell railway and operated it from 1868–1871 to provide a temporary route over the Alps for rail passengers from Calais to Brindisi until the completion of the Fréjus Rail Tunnel.

Personal life
He married, firstly, Anne Hay-Mackenzie (1829–1888), later created Countess of Cromartie in her own right, on 27 June 1849, at Cliveden House in Buckinghamshire. Together, they had five children:

 George Granville Sutherland-Leveson-Gower, Earl Gower (1850–1858), who died young.
 Cromartie Sutherland-Leveson-Gower, 4th Duke of Sutherland (1851–1913)
 Francis Mackenzie Sutherland-Leveson-Gower, 2nd Earl of Cromartie (1852–1893)
 Lady Florence Sutherland-Leveson-Gower (1855–1881), who married Henry Chaplin, 1st Viscount Chaplin and had issue. She narrowly escaped death on 3 August 1873 when the railway carriage she was travelling in was derailed in the Wigan rail crash.
 Lady Alexandra Sutherland-Leveson-Gower (1866–1891), who died unmarried.

Sutherland was estranged from his wife Anne for many years before her death in November 1888. Less than four months after her death, Sutherland married, on 4 March 1889, Mary Caroline (née Michell) Blair, with the Bishop of Florida, Edwin Garner Weed, officiating. causing a scandal as the conventional minimum period between the death of a spouse and remarriage being one year. Mary was the daughter of Rev. Richard Michell, DD, and the widow of Captain Arthur Kindersley Blair, formerly of the 71st Highland Light Infantry. Blair had resigned his commission in the Highlanders in 1861 and worked as a land agent and business manager for Sutherland; Mrs. Blair became Sutherland's mistress, and although Blair's death in 1883 was officially recorded as accidental, there was considerable speculation, at the time and later, that it may have been suicide or even murder.

The 3rd Duke of Sutherland died, aged sixty-three, at Dunrobin Castle, and was buried on 29 September 1892 at Trentham in Staffordshire. He was succeeded in his titles by his eldest surviving son, Cromartie. Their second, Francis, had succeeded to his wife's titles as the 2nd Earl of Cromartie upon her death in 1888.

Estate
Shortly before his death, Sutherland effectively disinherited his natural heirs and tried to leave all his money to his second wife, who was later found guilty of destroying documents and was imprisoned for six weeks. The family later made a substantial settlement in her favour, enabling her to build Carbisdale Castle between 1906 and 1917. Prior to this, she had resided at Sutherland Grange at Dedworth adjoining Windsor in Berkshire. Sutherland's widow, known as Duchess Blair, married thirdly on 12 November 1896 (sep 1904) as his second wife Sir Albert Kaye Rollit (1842–1922), MP for Islington South. She enjoyed an income of £100,000 until her death according to one source.

References

External links

The Leveson-Gower Family
thePeerage.com
His second Duchess Mary Caroline

1828 births
1892 deaths
People educated at Eton College
George Sutherland-Leveson-Gower, 3rd Duke of Sutherland
Alumni of King's College London
Dukes of Sutherland
George
Stafford, George Sutherland-Leveson-Gower, Marquess of
Scottish Liberal Party MPs
Lord-Lieutenants of Cromarty
Lord-Lieutenants of Sutherland
Stafford, George Sutherland-Leveson-Gower, Marquess of
Stafford, George Sutherland-Leveson-Gower, Marquess of
Stafford, George Sutherland-Leveson-Gower, Marquess of
Sutherland, D3
Fellows of the Royal Society
19th-century Scottish businesspeople